Zalesje (literally 'place beyond woods' several Slavic languages) may refer to:

Zalesye, a historical region of Russia
Zaļesje, a village in Latvia
Zaļesje Parish

See also 
 Zalesie (disambiguation)